Abortion in Missouri is illegal except in cases of medical emergency. In 2014, a poll by the Pew Research Center found that 52% of Missouri adults said that abortion should be legal vs. 46% that believe it should be illegal in all or most cases.  According to a 2014 Public Religion Research Institute (PRRI) study, 51% of white women in the state believed that abortion is legal in all or most cases.

Abortion in Missouri was legalized after the Roe v. Wade decision in 1973. Peaking at 29 abortion clinics in 1982, the number began to decline, going from twelve in 1992 to one in 2014, down to zero for a time in 2016, but back to one from 2017 to May 2019 when the last remaining clinic announced it would likely lose its license. However, the clinic remained open as of 2020.

According to the Guttmacher Institute, in 2017, there were 4,710 abortions in Missouri. There was an eight percent decline in the abortion rate in Missouri between 2014 and 2017, from 4.4 to 4.0 abortions per 1,000 women of reproductive age. Abortions in Missouri represent 0.5 percent of all abortions in the United States.

In 2017, about 33 percent of abortions were medication abortions.

The state saw anti-abortion rights violence in 2000 in Marion County.

On 24 June 2022, following the United States Supreme Court's ruling in Dobbs v. Jackson Women's Health Organization, Missouri Attorney General Eric Schmitt signed a proclamation bringing into effect the state's "trigger law", banning all non-medically necessary abortions.

Context 
According to a 2017 report from the Center for Reproductive Rights and Ibis Reproductive Health, states that tried to pass additional constraints on a women's ability to access legal abortions had fewer policies supporting women's health, maternal health and, children's health.  These states also tended to resist expanding Medicaid, family leave, medical leave, and sex education in public schools. In 2017, Georgia, Ohio, Missouri, Louisiana, Alabama and Mississippi have among the highest rates of infant mortality in the United States. In 2017, Missouri had an infant mortality rate of 6.2 infant deaths per 1,000 live births. Medicaid expansion under the Affordable Care Act was rejected by Alabama, Georgia, Mississippi and Missouri. Consequently, poor women in the typical age range to become mothers had a gap in coverage for prenatal care. According to Georgetown University Center for Children and Families research professor Adam Searing, "The uninsured rate for women of childbearing age is nearly twice as high in states that have not expanded Medicaid. That means many more women don't have health coverage before getting pregnant or after having their children.  If states expanded Medicaid coverage, they would improve the health of mothers and babies and save lives." According to the 2018 America's Health Rankings produced by United Health Foundation, Missouri ranked 42nd among US states for maternal mortality.

History

Legislative history 
By the end of the 1800s, all states in the Union except Louisiana had therapeutic exceptions in their legislative bans on abortions. In the 19th century, bans by state legislatures on abortion were about protecting the life of the mother given the number of deaths caused by abortions; state governments saw themselves as looking out for the lives of their citizens.

Missouri passed a parental consent law in the early 1990s. This law impacted when minors sought abortions, resulting in an increase of 19% to 22% for abortions sought after 12 weeks. The state was one of 10 states in 2007 to have a customary informed consent provision for abortions.

In 2015, the state was one of five where the legislature introduced a bill that would have banned abortion in almost all cases. It did not pass. They tried and failed again in 2017 and 2018. The 2018 bill was introduced in the legislature to ban abortion after 15 weeks. Around 2016, the state legislature passed a law that said facilities providing abortions needed to be licensed ambulatory surgical centers and to have hospital admitting privileges. The state legislature was one of eight states nationwide that tried and failed to pass a fetal heartbeat bill in 2017. They tried and failed again in 2018.

Nationally, 2019 was one of the most active years for state legislatures to try to pass abortion rights restrictions. These state governments generally saw this as a positive sign that new moves to restrict abortion rights, would less likely face resistance by the courts. In mid-2019, the state legislature passed a law that would make abortion illegal in almost all cases after eight weeks. The state was one of several states that passed such laws in May 2019 - others were Georgia, Louisiana, and Alabama. The law was a "fetal heartbeat" bill.

Two fetal heartbeat bills were filed in Missouri on January 9, 2019. SB 139 was filed in the Missouri Senate by Sen. Andrew Koenig; the bill is pending in the Health and Pensions Committee. HB 126 was filed in the Missouri House of Representatives by Rep. Nick Schroer. On January 30, 2019, HB 126 was referred to the Children and Families Committee, and on February 12, 2019, a public hearing on the bill was completed. On February 21, 2018, HB 126 was voted out of committee to the full House with the recommendation that it "do pass". On February 27, 2019, HB 126 was passed out of the Missouri House and was sent to the state Senate. Missouri's House Speaker Elijah Haahr has said he supports the "heartbeat bill" calling it a top priority for the 2019 session. When asked if he would sign a fetal heartbeat bill, Governor Mike Parson said, "I've been pro-life my entire career, and I support that all the time." At the time the bill passed, only 25% of the state legislators were female.

In March 2019, Missouri Family Health Council was the state's only Title X administrator.  The Council distributed approximately 34% of its funding to Planned Parenthood clinics. In 2019, women in Missouri were eligible for pregnancy accommodation and pregnancy-related disability as a result of legal abortion or miscarriage, and women who claimed such disability could not be treated differently than any other employee claiming disability.

On 24 June 2022, following the United States Supreme Court's ruling in Dobbs v. Jackson Women's Health Organization, Missouri Attorney General Eric Schmitt signed a proclamation bringing into effect the state's "trigger law", banning all non-medically necessary abortions.

Judicial history 
The US Supreme Court's decision in 1973's Roe v. Wade ruling meant the state could no longer regulate abortion in the first trimester. In 1979, a court found that the part of Missouri law dealing with women having abortions after the first trimester needing to have it performed in a hospital was unconstitutional. Webster v. Reproductive Health Services was before the US Supreme Court in 1989. The Court ruled in a case over a Missouri law that banned abortions from being performed in public buildings unless there was a need to save the life of the mother. It required physicians to determine if a fetus was past 20 weeks and was viable in addition to other restrictions on a woman's ability to get an abortion.  The US Supreme Court essentially ruled in favor of the law, but made clear that this was not an overruling of Roe v. Wade. However, the Supreme Court overturned Roe v. Wade in Dobbs v. Jackson Women's Health Organization,  later in 2022.

In 2019, a judge blocked a state law that would have banned abortion after eight weeks.

Clinic history 

Following the Roe v. Wade ruling, several abortion clinics were quickly set up in the state. These included private suppliers, many of which remained in the state during the 1980s. Reproductive Health Services was a non-profit that provided abortion services in the state operating during that time. Between 1982 and 1992, the number of abortion clinics in the state decreased by 17, going from 29 in 1982 to 12 in 1992.

Planned Parenthood in St. Louis took over operations of Reproductive Health Services on May 1, 1996. Before this, while Planned Parenthood had operated in the state, they had not provided abortion services. In 1998, they moved three blocks to a new building. After TRAP laws came into effect in Missouri and Texas, women had to travel even greater distances to be able to visit an abortion clinic.

In 2014, there was only one abortion clinic in the state. In 2014, 99% of the counties in the state did not have an abortion clinic. That year, 94% of women in the state aged 15–44 lived in a county without an abortion clinic. In March 2016, there were 13 Planned Parenthood clinics in the state. In 2016, Planned Parenthood's clinic that provided abortions in Colombia had to stop doing so while they faced a court injunction they were challenging over the legal need to be a licensed ambulatory surgical center and to have hospital admitting privileges.

In 2017, there were 12 Planned Parenthood clinics, of which 1 offered abortion services, in a state with a population of 1,365,575 women aged 15–49. Reproductive Health Services of Planned Parenthood St. Louis Region was the only licensed abortion service provider in the state in 2017, providing reproductive services primarily to women from Missouri and Illinois but also ten other states. Only about 10% of their operations were related to abortion services. In May 2019, the state was one of six states in the nation with only one abortion clinic. On May 28, 2019, the sole remaining abortion clinic in Missouri announced it would likely be shutting down by the end of the week as the state pulled its operating license. They were seeking an injunction to prevent that from happening. They succeeded when Missouri Circuit Court Judge Michael Stelzer granted a temporary request, saying in giving the order that the clinic "demonstrated that immediate and irreparable injury will result" and also saying that doing so "is necessary to preserve the status quo and prevent irreparable injury." He then set a hearing date for June 4, 2019.

Statistics 
In the period between 1972 and 1974, there was zero recorded illegal abortion death in the state. In 1990, 597,000 women in the state faced the risk of an unintended pregnancy. In 2010, the state had zero publicly funded abortions. In 2013, among white women aged 15–19, there were 670 abortions, 440 abortions for black women aged 15–19, 80 abortions for Hispanic women aged 15–19, and 80 abortions for women of all other races. In 2014, 50% of adults said in a poll by the Pew Research Center that abortion should be illegal in all or most cases, while 45% believe it should be legal. In 2017, about 33% of abortions were performed using drug-induced abortions. The percentage had been increasing every year for several years.

Abortion rights views and activities

Pro-abortion Views 
In talking about the granting of a temporary restraining order allowing the state's last remaining abortion clinic to remain open, President and CEO of Planned Parenthood Leana Wen said, "This is a victory for women across Missouri, but this fight is far from over. We have seen just how vulnerable access to abortion care is in Missouri—and the rest of the country."

Protests 
Women from the state participated in marches supporting abortion rights as part of a #StoptheBans movement in May 2019.

Anti-abortion views and activities

Views 
In talking about the granting of a temporary restraining order allowing the state's last remaining abortion clinic to remain open, Students for Life of America President Kristan Hawkins said, "Planned Parenthood caused this artificial crisis when they ignored the law and refused to comply with the state of Missouri's very reasonable requests."

References 

Missouri
Healthcare in Missouri
Women in Missouri